The Mindoro racket-tail (Prioniturus mindorensis) is a species of parrot in the Psittaculinae family. It was formerly considered conspecific with the blue-crowned racket-tail (Prioniturus discurus). It is endemic to the island of Mindoro in the Philippines and it occurs in tropical moist lowland  forest. It is threatened by habitat loss and trapping for the cage-bird trade.

Description and Taxonomy 
EBird describes the bird as "A medium-sized parrot of lowland and foothill forest on Mindoro. The two central tail feathers have extended shafts ending in a racket shape. Overall green in color, darker on the back and paler below, with deeper green on the head, a deep blue central crown, and a dark blue hind-crown and edge to the wing. Note the pale bill. Occurs together with Blue-naped Parrot, but is smaller and lacks the thick red bill. Voice includes various squeals and grating calls."

Females have shorter "rackets".

It eats berries, seeds and nuts.

Like all other Racket-tails, they are cavity nesters.

Habitat and Conservation Status 
It inhabits mainly tropica; moist lowland forest but has been known to inhabit  moist montane forest up to 1,670 meters above sea level bHas been to known to visit cultivated areas.

IUCN has assessed this bird as near threatened with its population being estimated as 2,500 to 9,999 mature individuals. It is threatened by habitat loss through legal and illegal logging, mining, road construction, slash-and-burn or kaingin and trapping for both food and the pet trade.  By 1988, extensive deforestation on Mindoro had reduced forest cover to a mere 120 km2, of which only a small proportion is below this species's upper altitudinal limit. The lowland forest that does remain is highly fragmented. Slash-and-burn cultivation, occasional selective logging and rattan collection threaten the forest fragments that still support the species. Dynamite blasting for marble is an additional threat to forest at Puerto Galera.

Conservation actions proposed are to survey to quantify the population. Study the species's habitat requirements. Assess the level of threat from trapping pressure. Use remote sensing techniques to track land-use change on Mindoro. Carry out awareness-raising activities to reduce trapping activities.

References

Mindoro racket-tail
Birds of Mindoro
Mindoro racket-tail
Mindoro racket-tail